Hip-Hop for Sale (stylized as Hip Hop For $ale) is the seventh studio album by rapper Canibus, released on November 1, 2005, through his own label Mic Club Music in conjunction with Babygrande Records and Koch Entertainment. The album was originally produced entirely by Nottz, but other up-and-coming producers were included on the project as well, such as Jeff Wheeler, Jay Swift, and Black Milk. The reason other producers were included was because in December 2004, over half of the completed material was leaked in the mixtape, The Vitruvian Man, causing tension between Canibus and Nottz. In an interview with SOHH, Nottz revealed he would no longer be working with him, saying Canibus leaked the material, blaming it on his manager Louis Lombard III. The record, which was originally slated to be released on May 10, 2005, was pushed back so Canibus could work on new material for the album. Because Nottz had cut ties with him, Canibus had to reach out to other producers.

Track listing

References

2005 albums
Canibus albums
Albums produced by Black Milk
Babygrande Records albums